COVID-19 datasets are public databases for sharing case data and medical information related to the COVID-19 pandemic.

Aggregate statistics

United States

Volunteer/non-government

U.S. Department of Health & Human Services

Global 
 Johns Hopkins Coronavirus Resource Center: Global aggregated data including cases, testing, contact tracing, and vaccine development
 World Health Organization (WHO) Coronavirus Disease Dashboard: a database of confirmed cases and deaths reported globally and broken down by region. This database is part of the WHO Health Data Platform.
 COVID-19 Africa Open Data Project: a volunteer-run database and dashboard reporting region, country and district level case counts, deaths, healthcare worker infections, healthcare services and urgent needs.

Data hubs 
 Health Data Research UK provides a searchable registry of health data resources from the United Kingdom, including COVID-19 related datasets.
 NIH Open Access Datasets: The National Institutes of Health provide open-access data and computational resources related to COVID-19.
 COVID-19 Open Research Dataset (CORD-19): The Semantic Scholar project of the Allen Institute for AI hosts CORD-19, a public dataset of academic articles about COVID-19 and related research. The dataset is updated daily and includes both peer-reviewed articles and preprints. CORD-19 was originally released on March 16, 2020, by researchers and leaders from the Allen Institute for AI, Chan Zuckerburg Initiative, Georgetown University's Center for Security and Emerging Technhology, Microsoft, and the National Library of Medicine. The dataset is created through the use of text mining of the current research literature.

Topic-specific and special-interest resources

Genomics 
 Open access Gene sequencing data for SARS-CoV-2 is provided by GISAID and included in an interactive Phylogenetic tree dashboard  on Nextstrain, an open-source pathogen genome data project.

Imaging (Radiology) 
 Characteristic imaging features on chest radiographs and computed tomography (CT) of people who are symptomatic include asymmetric peripheral ground-glass opacities without pleural effusions. The University of Montreal and Mila created the "COVID-19 Image Data Collection" in March which is a public data repository of chest imaging.  The Medical Imaging Databank in Valencian Region released a large dataset of chest imaging from Spain. The Italian Radiological Society is compiling an international online database of imaging findings for confirmed cases. Online radiology case sharing platforms such as Eurorad and Radiopaedia serve as platforms for sharing COVID-19 case data and imaging.

References

datasets
Datasets